Marcus Gilmore (born October 10, 1986) is an American drummer. In 2009, New York Times critic Ben Ratliff included Gilmore in his list of drummers who are "finding new ways to look at the drum set, and at jazz itself", saying, "he created that pleasant citywide buzz when someone new and special blows through New York clubs and jam sessions"..

Biography
Marcus Gilmore is the grandson of Roy Haynes, who gave him his first drum kit at the age of ten, and the nephew of Graham Haynes.

A graduate of the Fiorello H. LaGuardia High School of Music & Art and Performing Arts, Marcus also received full ride scholarships to the Juilliard School of Music and Manhattan School of Music. He has been touring professionally since the age of sixteen.

Marcus has performed with some of today’s best known contemporary jazz artists, including Chick Corea, Gonzalo Rubalcaba,  Nicholas Payton,  Steve Coleman, Vijay Iyer, and Ambrose Akinmusire. He is also embarking on solo projects with his bands "Actions Speak" and "Silhouwav."

He has been named a protégé of the 2018 Rolex Mentors And Protégé project.

In August 2020, Gilmore contributed to the live streamed recording of the singer Bilal's EP VOYAGE-19, created remotely during the COVID-19 lockdowns. It was released the following month with proceeds from its sales going to participating musicians in financial hardship from the lockdown.

Awards and honors
Marcus Gilmore is the recipient of several awards such as a Latin Grammy Award for his work with pianist and composer Chick Corea.

Marcus was introduced as one of the “25 for the Future” by DownBeat magazine in 2016.

Gilmore was featured on the cover of the June 2019 issue of Modern Drummer.

Musical Style
Like his grandfather, Gilmore draws upon a wide variety of influences from Tony Williams to free jazz drummer Milford Graves. When talking about Graves in Modern Drummer, he said "A lot of Milford’s playing deals with rhythm, but not in a very metric way—it’s non-metric, a lot of waves. It’s still melodic, even more so because it’s very linguistic. Milford doesn’t even really play snares. He keeps the snares off. His drumming sounds very melodic and very lyrical. It sounds like a language." He has specifically cited Elvin Jones on the album Speak No Evil and Tony Williams' Lifetime as influences.

Discography

As sideman
With Steve Coleman
 2006 Steve Coleman and Five Elements, Weaving Symbolics (Blue Label)
 2011 The Mancy of Sound (Pi)
 2015 Synovial Joints (Pi)

With Chick Corea
 2012 The Continents: Concerto for Jazz Quintet & Chamber Orchestra
 2013 The Vigil
 2019 Antidote

With Graham Haynes
 2007 Full Circle (Kindred Rhythm)

With Taylor McFerrin
 2014 Early Riser (Brainfeeder)

With Gilad Hekselman
 2008 Words Unspoken
 2011 Hearts Wide Open (Jazz Village)
 2013 This Just In (Jazz Village)
 2015 Homes

With Vijay Iyer
 2005 Reimagining (Savoy Jazz )
 2008 Tragicomic (Sunnyside)
 2009 Historicity (ACT)
 2012 Accelerando (ACT)
 2015 Break Stuff (ECM)

With Joe Martin
 2009 Not by Chance (Anzic)

With Nicholas Payton
 2008 Into the Blue (Nonesuch)

With Chris Potter
 2017 The Dreamer Is the Dream (ECM)

With Gonzalo Rubalcaba
 2008 Avatar (Blue Note)
 2011 XXI Century (SPassion)

With Mark Turner
 2014 Lathe of Heaven (ECM)

With Ambrose Akinmusire
 2018 Origami Harvest (Blue Note)

With In Common: Walter Smith III & Matthew Stevens
 2018 In Common (Feat. Joel Ross, Harish Raghavan and Marcus Gilmore) (Whirlwind Recordings)

References 

Living people
1986 births
American jazz drummers
21st-century American drummers